John Joseph Robert York (born December 10, 1958) is an American actor. Although York has made appearances on such television shows as Dynasty, Family Ties, and 21 Jump Street, he is most recognizable for playing the role of Malcolm "Mac" Scorpio on the daytime soap opera General Hospital.

Background 
York was born in Chicago, Illinois, where he attended Brother Rice Christian Brothers High School. His second-longest running role (after General Hospital) was as college student Eric Cord on the Fox network television series Werewolf. He co-starred in the Nickelodeon made-for-TV film Drake & Josh Go Hollywood, and in an episode of Wizards of Waverly Place.

Filmography

Film

Television

External links

1958 births
American male television actors
Living people
Male actors from Chicago